Nagaina is a genus of jumping spiders that was first described by George and Elizabeth Peckham in 1896. The name is derived from Nagaina, a character from Rudyard Kipling's Rikki-Tikki-Tavi. Other salticid genera with names of Kipling's characters include Bagheera, Messua, and Akela.

Species
 it contains five species, found in Panama, Mexico, Brazil, and on the Greater Antilles:
Nagaina berlandi Soares & Camargo, 1948 – Brazil
Nagaina diademata Simon, 1902 – Brazil
Nagaina incunda Peckham & Peckham, 1896 (type) – Mexico to Panama
Nagaina olivacea Franganillo, 1930 – Cuba
Nagaina tricincta Simon, 1902 – Brazil

References

Salticidae genera
Salticidae
Spiders of Central America
Spiders of Mexico
Spiders of South America